RTS Racing Team is a Taiwanese UCI Continental cycling team managed by Wen Chin Lin and sponsored by Giant Bicycles, Kinlin Industrial Corporation, Kenda, Kalloy, OGK Helmet, Yaban Chain, Ashima, Exustar, Smanie, Cionlli, XPEDO, VIM Group and Adidas Eyewear.

History
RTS Racing Team was established by president Liu of Corporation unofficially around 1990. Lin Qing Fa was appointed coach in 1992, and was later replaced by Lin Wen Chin. Over its first decade, RTS Racing Team became Mountain biking and Road racing champions in Taiwan, and represented Taiwan in many races abroad.

In 2002, RTS Racing Team was formally established, under the name Giant Asia Racing Team, by general manager Liu Yong Chang. Lin Wen Chin was appointed as the manager of the team, and it was officially registered as a Trade Team III, the first such team registered in Asia. Together with Giant, thirteen other financial sponsors helped cover the expenditure of the cycling team.

Team roster

Major wins

2002
Overall Tour de Korea, Tang Xuezhong
Stages 2 & 4, Tang Xuezhong
Stage 5 Tour of Bulgaria, Jamsrangiin Ölzii-Orshikh
Overall Perlis Open, Jamsrangiin Ölzii-Orshikh
Stage 1, Jamsrangiin Ölzii-Orshikh
Stage 3, Paul Redenbach
Tour de Okinawa, Paul Redenbach
2003
Overall Tour de Korea, Glen Chadwick
Stage 3, Glen Chadwick
Stage 4b Tour of Queensland, Brett Aitken
2004
 Time Trial Championships, David McCann
Overall Presidential Cycling Tour of Turkey, Ahad Kazemi
Stages 1 & 2 Tour de Korea, David McCann
2005
 Time Trial Championships, David McCann
Overall Kerman Tour, Hossein Askari
Stage 2, Ghader Mizbani
Overall Tour de Korea, David McCann
Stage 2, David McCann
Overall Azerbaijan Tour, Ghader Mizbani
Prologue, Hossein Askari
Stage 2, Ghader Mizbani
Stage 3, David McCann
Stage 5, Paul Griffin
Overall Tour de East Java, Ahad Kazemi
Stage 1, Paul Griffin
Stage 2, Ahad Kazemi
Stage 4, Ghader Mizbani
Stage 5 Tour of Qinghai Lake, Ghader Mizbani
Overall Tour de Indonesia, Hossein Askari
Stage 1, Paul Griffin
Stage 2, David McCann
Stage 3, Hossein Askari
Overall Tour of Milad du Nour, David McCann
Stage 1, David McCann
Stage 6, Ahad Kazemi
Stage 6 Herald Sun Tour, David McCann
Overall Tour de Taiwan, Ahad Kazemi
Stage 4, Ahad Kazemi
2006
 Road Race Championships, David McCann
 Time Trial Championships, Ghader Mizbani
Stage 7 Tour of Siam, Daniel Lloyd
Stage 1 & 4 Tour of Thailand, David McCann
Overall Kerman Tour, Ghader Mizbani
Stage 1, Ghader Mizbani
Stages 2 & 4, Hossein Askari
Overall Tour de Korea, Tobias Erler
Stage 3, Tobias Erler
Overall Azerbaijan Tour, Ghader Mizbani
Stage 2, Hossein Askari
Overall Tour de East Java, Ghader Mizbani
Stage 4, Ghader Mizbani
Stage 4 Tour of Qinghai Lake, Daniel Lloyd
Stage 5 Tour of Qinghai Lake, David McCann
Overall Tour of Milad du Nour, Ghader Mizbani
Stage 2, Ghader Mizbani
Stages 6 & 7, Hossein Askari
Overall Tour de Indonesia, David McCann
2007
 Road Race Championships, Ghader Mizbani
 Time Trial Championships, Hossein Askari
Stage 4 Jelajah Malaysia, Hossein Askari
Stage 7 Jelajah Malaysia, Lai Kuan-Hua
Overall Tour of Siam, Jai Crawford
Stage 4, Ghader Mizbani
Stage 4 Tour de Taiwan, Ghader Mizbani
Stage 1 Kerman Tour, Ghader Mizbani
Stage 3 Kerman Tour, Hossein Askari
Overall Azerbaijan Tour, Hossein Askari
Stage 2, Hossein Askari
Stages 3 & 8, Ahad Kazemi
Stage 4 Ghader Mizbani
Overall Tour of Milad du Nour, Ghader Mizbani
Stage 4, Ahad Kazemi
Stage 5, Ghader Mizbani
2008
Stage 6 Tour de Korea, David McCann
Overall Tour of Thailand, Alex Coutts
Stage 2, Stefan Löffler
2010
 Time Trial Championships, David McCann
 Road Race Championships, Eugen Wacker
 Time Trial Championships, Eugen Wacker
Overall Tour de Taiwan, David McCann
Stage 1, David McCann
Stage 1 Tour of Thailand, David McCann
Overall Tour de Filipinas, David McCann
Stages 1 & 4, David McCann
Overall Melaka Governor's Cup, David McCann
Stage 1, David McCann
Overall Jelajah Malaysia, David McCann
Stages 4 & 6 Tour of China, Rico Rogers
2011
Stage 7 Tour de Taiwan, Rico Rogers
2012
Stage 2 Jelajah Malaysia, Jai Crawford
2013
 Road Race Championships, Muradjan Khalmuratov
 Time Trial Championships, Muradjan Khalmuratov
Stage 4 Tour de Ijen, Rahim Emami
Overall Tour of Fuzhou, Rahim Emami
Stage 1, Boris Shpilevsky
Stage 2, Rahim Emami
Sea Games Myanmar Road Race, Alex Ariya Destribois-Coudroy
2014
 Road Race Championships, Ruslan Karimov
Stage 7 Tour of China I, Boris Shpilevsky
Overall Tour of China II, Boris Shpilevsky
Stages 2 & 5, Boris Shpilevsky
Stages 5 & 9 Tour of Taihu Lake, Boris Shpilevsky
Stage 1 Tour of Fuzhou, Boris Shpilevsky
2015
Stage 5 Tour de Taiwan, Tino Thömel
Stage 8 Tour de Korea, Tino Thömel
 Road Race Championships, Park Sang-hong
Stage 7 Tour of Hainan, Tino Thömel
Stage 2 Tour of Yancheng Coastal Wetlands, Tino Thömel
2018
 Road Race Championships, Muradjan Khalmuratov

References

External links
 Team's Official website
 Team's Profile in CyclingWebsite.com

Cycling teams based in Taiwan
UCI Continental Teams (Asia)
Cycling teams established in 2002